William Peterson may refer to:

Academics
 William H. Peterson (1921–2012), economist, writer, and speaker following the ideas of Ludwig von Mises
 William Peterson (academic) (1856–1921), Scottish academic and Principal of McGill University, Canada
 William Peterson (priest), Dean of Carlisle, and of Exeter
 W. Wesley Peterson (1924–2009), American mathematician and computer scientist

Politicians
 William Peterson (MP) (died 1578), Member of Parliament (MP) for Lewes
 William E. Peterson (born 1936), Republican member of the Illinois Senate
 William H. Peterson (politician), member of the 1865–1867 California State Assembly

Sports
 Bill Peterson (1920–1993), American football coach
 Bill Peterson (linebacker) (born 1945), American football player
 Bill Peterson (basketball) (born 1957), director of basketball operations  at Baylor University
 William James (American football) (William James Peterson, Jr., born 1979), American football cornerback
 William Peterson (footballer), British footballer in the early 20th-century

See also
 William Petersen (born 1953), American actor
 William Petersson (1895–1965), Swedish athlete
 William Pedersen (disambiguation)
 William G. Pietersen (born 1937), businessman and author